Thomas Coyle (born 9 January 1959) is a Scottish former professional football midfielder. His brothers Joe and Owen also played professionally.

Coyle began his career with non-league Shettleston before signing for Dumbarton in 1978. He established himself in the first team at Boghead Park and, along with Albert Craig, scored in a 2–2 draw with Clyde that ensured Dumbarton promotion to the Scottish Premier Division for the first time.

Aside from playing in the club's only season in the revamped top division Coyle appeared in the first team alongside both of his brothers. He left Dumbarton in 1987 and went on to play for St Johnstone and Clydebank.

References

1959 births
Living people
Scottish footballers
Scottish people of Irish descent
Glasgow United F.C. players
Dumbarton F.C. players
St Johnstone F.C. players
Association football midfielders
Clydebank F.C. (1965) players
Footballers from Glasgow
Scottish Junior Football Association players
Scottish Football League players